Transkeidectes multidentis, the Transkei Shieldback is a species of katydid in the family Tettigoniidae. The species is endemic to Port St. Johns in South Africa.

References

Insects described in 1992
Tettigoniidae